Sa Jae-Hyouk (Hangul: 사재혁, Hanja: 史載赫; ; born January 29, 1985, in Hongcheon, Gangwon-do, South Korea) is a South Korean weightlifter. He is 165 cm tall.

In 2005, Sa won two gold medals in the clean and jerk and total at the 1st Junior World Weightlifting Championships in Busan, South Korea.

At the 2007 World Weightlifting Championships he ranked 5th in the 77 kg category, with a total of 353 kg.

In 2008, he won a gold medal in the 77 kg class at the 2008 Summer Olympics in Beijing.

At the 2009 World Weightlifting Championships he ranked 4th in the 77 kg category, with a total of 365 kg.

At the 2012 Summer Olympics, he dislocated his elbow while attempting 162 kg in his second snatch attempt and was forced to withdraw from the competition.

Notes and references 

Living people
South Korean male weightlifters
Olympic weightlifters of South Korea
Weightlifters at the 2008 Summer Olympics
Weightlifters at the 2012 Summer Olympics
Olympic gold medalists for South Korea
1985 births
World Weightlifting Championships medalists
Olympic medalists in weightlifting
Medalists at the 2008 Summer Olympics
Weightlifters at the 2014 Asian Games
Cheongju Sa clan
Asian Games competitors for South Korea
South Korean Buddhists
Sportspeople from Gangwon Province, South Korea
20th-century South Korean people
21st-century South Korean people